Yasothon Province Stadium (Suan Phayathan Stadium) is a multi-purpose stadium in Yasothon province , Thailand. It is currently used mostly for football matches and is the home stadium of Yasothon F.C.

Multi-purpose stadiums in Thailand
Buildings and structures in Yasothon province